Samit Ghosh is the founder of Ujjivan Financial Services Limited, and served as its managing director and chief executive officer until 31 January 2017, when he accepted an equivalent role with subsidiary Ujjivan Small Finance Bank.

Early life and education 
Born in 1949, Samit Ghosh spent a large part of his early years in Dhanbad. His father was a doctor who served the Indian Army during World War II and set up a number of government hospitals in the poor coal mining areas. His mother was a professor in Sri Shikshyatan College. Ghosh completed his undergraduate in economics from St. Xavier's College in Kolkata and Master of Business Administration in finance from The Wharton School of Business at the University of Pennsylvania, United States.

Career 
Samit Ghosh has a banking career spanning over 30 years in India, South Asia and the Middle East. He started his career with Citibank in 1975 and grew consistently working in various roles and ending up as a corporate banker. In 1980, Ghosh moved to the Arab Bank in Bahrain as the vice president for investment and corporate banking. After serving in the Middle East, he returned to India in 1985 to rejoin Citibank to pioneer the consumer banking business in India, targeting the middle class.
In 1993, Ghosh moved to Standard Chartered Bank in Dubai as the regional head of personal banking for South Asia and Middle East. His final stint before starting Ujjivan was with Bank of Muscat at the CEO to set up the bank in India.

Other roles 
He has served as the president of Microfinance Institutions Network (MFIN) and chairman of Association of Karnataka Microfinance Institutions (AKMI).

Awards and honors 
Samit Ghosh was awarded as Social Impact Entrepreneur of the Year Award in 2015 by Forbes India.

References

Living people
Businesspeople from Karnataka
Indian microfinance people
Year of birth missing (living people)